Anita Agnihotri (born 24 September 1956) is an Indian Bengali writer and poet. She has been translated into major Indian and foreign languages, including but not limited to English, Swedish and German. She is also a retired civil servant (Indian Administrative Service 1980 batch). She lives in India.

Early life and career
Anita Agnihotri (née Chatterjee) was born and spent her childhood in Kolkata. She earned a Bachelor of Arts in economics at Presidency College in Kolkata, and graduated with a Masters in Economics from Calcutta University.

She was selected for the IAS in 1980 to the Odisha cadre. She went on to have a 37-year career in the civil service. As an IAS, she was Collector of Sundargarh district of Odisha and was Principal Secretary in departments such as Textiles and Industries. In 1991, she took a sabbatical from IAS and completed Masters in Development Economics from the University of East Anglia, Norwich, UK.
 
At the centre, she was a joint DG in Directorate General of Foreign Trade (DGFT) between 1996 and 2001, and then Development Commissioner of SEEPZ, Mumbai in 2008–2011 at the rank of Joint Secretary. She was also the member secretary of the National Commission for Women.  She retired in 2016 as Secretary, Ministry of Social Justice and Empowerment, Government of India.

Writing
Anita commenced writing at an early age. The writer Bimal Kar encouraged her to pursue a literary career. As a school student, she used to write for renowned filmmaker Satyajit Ray's children's magazine Sandesh, something that gave her confidence and also shaped her literary sensibilities. Her writing has been compared with that of noted Bengali writer Mahasweta Devi.

In 1991, on a sabbatical from the IAS to pursue a course on rural development in UK's Anglia Ruskin University, she wrote the novella 'Mahuldiha Days capturing the incidents that she had encountered as an administrator in Odisha's Mahuldiha.

In 2015, Anita's book Mahanadi was published. The eponymous book is written with the river Mahanadi in the first person. It tells the story of a river that flows through some of the least developed (and poorest) regions of Chhattisgarh and Odisha, and the profound influence of the river on the regions society, culture and economics.

In 2021, Niyogi Books published the English translation of Mahanadi under the imprint Thornbird.

Awards and recognition

 Indu Basu Smriti Puraskar 
 Sahitya Setu Puraskar
 Bangla Academy Somen Chanda Puraskar, (Anita returned this award in protest of the killing of innocent people in Nandigram)
 Sarat Puraskar
 Bangiya Sahitya Parishad Samman
 Golpomela Puraskar
 Sailajananda Smriti Puraskar
 Gajendra Kumar Mitra Smriti Puraskar
 Pratibha Basu Smriti Puraskar
 Bhuban Mohini Dasi Gold Medal by Calcutta University for contribution to Bengali literature
 Economist-Crossword Award, 2011 in the category ‘Indian Language Fiction Translation’ for Anita's collection of stories Seventeen, translated from Bengali by Arunava Sinha
 Khonj Sahitya Puraskar 2022, awarded by Khonj Sahitya Patrika, West Bengal, India.

Bibliography
Poetry collections

 Chandan Gaachh (1987)
 Brishti Asbe (1992)
 Snajowa Bahini Jay (1995)
 Nirbachita Kabita (1996)
 Braille (2002)
 Kritanjali Megh (2008)
 Kabita Samagra (2009)
 MalimHarbour (2015)
 Ayna Matrisama (2016)
 Shreshtha Kabita (2019)

Novels

 Mahuldihar Din (1996)
 Jara Bhalobesechhilo (1998, new Sopan edition 2019)
 Akalbodhan (2003)
 Alik Jiban (2006)
 Sukhabasi (2009)
 Aynay Manush Nai (2013)
 Mahanadi (2015)
 Upanyas Samagra (2018)
 Kaste (2019)
 Mahakantar (2021)
 Labanakta (2022)

Collections of Short Stories

 Chandan Rekha (1993)
 Pratikshan Galpa Sankalan (1997)
 Tarani (2000)
 Atal Sparsha (2006)
 Shrestha Galpa (2003, enlarged 2018)
 Panchashti Galpa (2012)
 Dashti Galpa (2009)
 Bhalobasar Galpa (2018)
 Sera Panchashti Galpa (2018)
 Panchashti Galpa (2019)
 Palasher Ayu (2022)

Children's and Juvenile Literature

 Akim O Porikonye (1993)
 Akim O Dwiper Manush, Akim Niruddesh, Ratan Master er Pathshala, Bandi Rajkumar (2004)
 Joyramer Sinduk (2006)
 Ebu Gogo (2009)
 Chhotoder Galpa Samagra (2012)
 Chhotoder Galpamela (2020)

Essay Collections / Non-fictions

 Kolkatar Pratima Shilpira (2001)
 Unnayan O Prantik Manush (2007)
 Desher Bhitor Desh (2013)
 Ei Andhare Ke Jage (2019)
 Rod Bataser Path (2021)
 Amar Pratibader Bhasha (2022)
 Involuntary Displacement in Dam Projects edited by A.B. Ota & Anita Agnihotri ; foreword by Michael Cernea. Prachi Prakashan, 1996. 

Translated Books

 Those who had known love (2000)
 Forest Interludes (2001/ Kali for Women)
 Dagar I Mahuldiha (Swedish) (2006 / Bokförlaget Tranan)
 The Awakening (2009/ Zubaan)
 Sabotage (2013)
 Seventeen (2015/ Zubaan)
 Mahuldiha Days (2018/Zubaan)
 A Day in the life of Mangal Taram ( 2020)
 The Sickle (2021)
 Mahanadi (2021/ Niyogi Books)

References

External links
 Official Website

1956 births
Living people
Bengali Hindus
20th-century Bengalis
21st-century Bengalis
Bengali poets
Bengali-language writers
Bengali female poets
20th-century Bengali poets
Indian writers
Indian civil servants
20th-century Indian writers
21st-century Indian writers
20th-century Indian women writers
21st-century Indian women writers
Indian poets
Indian women poets
21st-century Indian poets
20th-century Indian poets
Indian translators
Indian women translators
20th-century Indian translators
21st-century Indian translators
Indian novelists
Indian women novelists
20th-century Indian novelists
21st-century Indian novelists
Indian short story writers
Indian women short story writers
20th-century Indian short story writers
21st-century Indian short story writers
Indian children's writers
Indian women children's writers
Indian essayists
Indian women essayists
20th-century Indian essayists
21st-century Indian essayists
Indian non-fiction writers
Indian women non-fiction writers
20th-century Indian non-fiction writers
21st-century Indian non-fiction writers
University of Calcutta alumni
Alumni of the University of East Anglia
Writers from Kolkata
Women writers from West Bengal